"Lifetime" is a song by Filipino folk-pop band Ben&Ben, composed by lead vocalists Miguel Benjamin Guico and Paolo Benjamin Guico. It was released on June 4, 2020.

Background

The song was inspired by a fan's comment from the music video of "Pagtingin" on YouTube. The fan, who uses the name Anne jou on YouTube, wrote her experience of being secretly in love with her best friend, but was scared of expressing her feelings as she feared of losing her friendship with him. Eight years later, at her best friend's wedding with another woman, he thanked her for being her best friend and confessed that, just like her, he had feelings for her, but was scared of expressing his feelings for her fearing the loss of their friendship also.

Release
The standalone single and lyric video were released on Spotify and YouTube respectively on June 4, 2020. The music video was written and directed by Raymond Dacones and Trina Razon, and was released on July 29, 2020.

Performances
In 2020,  albeit being held virtually, Ben&Ben recorded a performance of the song for the Myx Music Awards 2020.

Credits and personnel
Credits appear on Tidal, lyric video, and official video.
Ben&Ben - performer, producer
Paolo Benjamin Guico - primary vocals, lyrics and music
Miguel Benjamin Guico - primary vocals, lyrics and music
Andrew De Pano - arrangement, backing vocals
Toni Muñoz - arrangement, backing vocals
Pat Lasaten - arrangement
Keifer Cabugao - arrangement
Agnes Reoma - arrangement
Jam Villanueva - arrangement
Poch Barretto - arrangement
Jean Paul Verona - producer and mixing
Leon Zervos - mastering engineer

Awards and nominations

References

2020 songs
2020 singles
Ben&Ben songs
English-language Filipino songs